The 2013 ISF Men's World Championship, also known as the 2013 ISF Tradestaff Men's World Championship for sponsorship reasons,  was an international softball tournament. The tournament was held at Rosedale Park in Auckland, New Zealand from 1–10 March 2013. It was the 13th time the World Championship took place. Sixteen nations competed, including defending champions Australia.

In the end, New Zealand won over Venezuela. Defending champions, Australia finished third.

Final standings

External links
Official website (Archived)
Final standings

References

ISF Men's World Championship
2013 ISF Men's World Championship
Men's Softball World Championship
March 2013 sports events in New Zealand
2013 in New Zealand sport
2010s in Auckland
Sports competitions in Auckland